The Audiencia Nacional is a centralised court in Spain with jurisdiction over all of the Spanish territory. It is specialised in a certain scope of delinquency, having original jurisdiction over major crimes such as those committed against the Crown and its members, terrorism, forgery of currency, credit and debit cards and checks, some trade crimes committed in more than one region and over drug trafficking, food frauds and medical frauds committed in a nationwide level as well as over international crimes which come under the competence of Spanish courts. (LOPJ § 65). It has also appellate jurisdiction over the cases of the Criminal Chamber of the National Court (LOPJ § 64).

The Audiencia Nacional was created in 1977 at the same time as the Public Order Court (Tribunal de Orden Público), an exceptional court created in Francoist Spain, ceased to exist.

Most of the rulings of the National Court can ultimately be appealed before the Supreme Court (Tribunal Supremo). Its seat lies in Madrid, at Calle García Gutiérrez, 1, located across the Plaza Villa de Paris from the Supreme Court.

Structure
The Audiencia is composed of its President, the Presidents of the Chambers, and the magistrates that the law specifies for each one of its courts and divisions.

The Audiencia includes the following chambers:

 Criminal Chamber, which is competent to try certain types of serious crimes such as terrorism, money laundering, genocide, etc., makes decisions about extradition demands by foreign countries and the execution of European arrest warrants, and hears appeals against rulings of the Central Criminal Courts (Juzgados Centrales de lo Penal).
 Appeals Chamber, which hears appeals against rulings of the Criminal Chamber.
 Administrative Chamber, which exercises judicial review of administrative decisions by senior officers (Ministers and Secretaries of State of the Government) and certain specialised agencies (Spanish Data Protection Agency, Concurrence Protection Commission, etc.)
 Social Chamber, which has jurisdiction over collective conflicts between businesspersons and workers.

Related courts
Even when they are not part of the National Court, because they are in the same building, the Central Courts are popularly considered part of it. These courts have jurisdiction in all the national territory.

 Central Criminal Courts (LOPJ § 89 bis). They prosecute the same crimes as the Criminal Chamber when they have sentence of less than five years of prison.
 Central Instruction Courts (LOPJ § 88). These courts investigate the crimes that are then prosecuted by the Criminal Chamber of the National Court or the Central Criminal Courts.
 Central Courts of Prison Vigilance (LOPJ § 94.4). They attend to the enforcement of the penalties imposed by the National Court or the Central Criminal Court
 Central Minors Courts (LOPJ § 96.2). They prosecutes the same crimes as the National Court and the Central Criminal Court but when minors are accused.
 Central Administrative Courts (LOPJ § 90.4). These courts a responsible for the appeals against dispositions and acts emanated from authorities, organisms, organs and public entities with competence over the national territory.

Prosecutor's Office

The Prosecutor's Office of the National Court is the body of the Attorney General's Office that prosecute all the cases related to the National Court with the exception of those cases granted to the Special Prosecution Offices (Anti-Drug Prosecutor's Office and Prosecutor's Office against Corruption and Organized Crime).

The Prosecutor's Office, and the Special Prosecution Offices are headed each one by a Chief Prosecutor and with a Lieutenant Prosecutor as second-in-command.

See also
 Constitutional Court of Spain
 Judiciary of Spain

References

Courts in Spain
1977 establishments in Spain
Judiciary of Spain